Baloncesto Fuenlabrada, S.A.D., known as Carplus Fuenlabrada because of sponsorship reasons, or just as Fuenlabrada, is a professional basketball team based in Fuenlabrada, Spain. The team plays in the Liga ACB and plays their home games at Fernando Martín.

History
Founded in 1983, Fuenlabrada started to compete at a local level. The club joined national competitions two years later and worked its way up, reaching the first regional division in the late 1980s. By 1991, it already became Baloncesto Fuenlabrada and a year later, it merged with CB Torrejón de Ardoz to compete in the Spanish second division.

Fuenlabrada acquired Club Peñas Recreativas de Huesca's rights to earn the right to compete in the Spanish first division in the 1996–97 season. The club went down to the second division, but inked scoring machine Velimir Perasović and returned to the elite level a year later. With Perasović, Carlos Cazorla, Ferran Lopez and Salvador Guardia as its main pillars, the addition of Nate Huffman allowed Fuenlabrada to make it to the Spanish League playoffs in 1999 and their debut in the Korać Cup. Perasović kept filling the baskets for several seasons, leading Fuenlabrada to two more playoffs appearances in 2001 and 2002, helped by David Wood, Chuck Kornegay and a young José Manuel Calderón and coached by Óscar Quintana.

Fuenlabrada made its ULEB Cup debut in the 2002–03 season, in which Herrmann was chosen as the Spanish League MVP. The club returned to the Spanish second division in 2004 but came back, for good, a year later. Players like Saúl Blanco, Jorge García, Kristaps Valters and Brad Oleson kept Fuenlabrada in the first division for years without much trouble. The club returned to the Spanish League playoffs in the 2010–11 season with Salva Maldonado as head coach and a young Gustavo Ayón as its star center.

One year later, the club would be eliminated in the quarterfinals of the EuroChallenge by Triumph Lyubertsy. Despite this European achievement, Fuenlabrada would continue fighting to avoid relegation, finally being relegated to LEB Oro in 2015. However, the club continued in Liga ACB as Ford Burgos and Club Ourense Baloncesto would not fulfill the requirements for promoting.

Fuenlabrada took advantage and led by Marko Popović, Jonathan Tabu and Ivan Paunić, Fuenlabrada made it to the Spanish League playoffs, earning the right to return to the EuroCup 13 years later. In the 2016-2017 season, Fuenlabrada played well and qualified to the EuroCup Top16. However, they only finished 12th in the ACB. After a 9th-place finish in the 2017-2018 ACB season, Fuenlabrada earned the right to compete in the FIBA Basketball Champions League. Fuenlabrada won the first 3 games, before suffering a complete fiasco and finishing the tournament with 11 consecutive losses.

Sponsorship naming
Baloncesto Fuenlabrada has had several denominations through the years due to its sponsorship:

Team logos

Home arenas
San Esteban Public High School Court (1983–88).
Miguel Hernández Public High School Gymnasium (1988–91).
Pabellón Fernando Martín (1991–present).

Players

Retired numbers 

Source:

Other notable players

  Anthony Brown 
  Maurice Kemp
  Rolands Šmits
  Mareks Mejeris
  Siim-Sander Vene

Current roster

Depth chart

Head coaches
Managers since 1993:

Óscar Quintana 1993–1995, 1997–2004
Martín Fariñas 1995–1996
Andreu Casadevall 1996–1997 
Luis Casimiro 2004–2008, 2014–2015
Luis Guil 2008–2009
Chus Mateo 2009, 2013-14
Salva Maldonado 2009–2011
Porfirio Fisac 2011–2012
Trifón Poch 2012–2013
Hugo López 2015
Jesús Sala 2015
Žan Tabak 2015
Jota Cuspinera 2015–2017, 2019–2020
Che García 2017–2018, 2018–2019
Agustí Julbe 2018
Paco García 2020
Javier Juárez 2020–present

Season by season

Team records and awards

Records
20 seasons in ACB
2 seasons in LEB
2 seasons in EBA
2 seasons in Primera División B

Trophies
LEB Oro: (1)
2005
Copa Príncipe de Asturias: (2)
1998, 2005
Torneo Comunidad de Madrid: (1)
1998

Individual awards
ACB Most Valuable Player
Wálter Herrmann – 2003

EuroCup Basketball Rising Star
Rolands Šmits – 2017

ACB Rising Star
Brad Oleson – 2009
Gustavo Ayón – 2011

All-ACB Second Team
Marko Popović – 2016

ACB Three Point Shootout Champion
Sergiy Gladyr – 2012

Baloncesto Fuenlabrada B
Baloncesto Fuenlabrada B, also known as Fundación Baloncesto Fuenlabrada, is the reserve team of Fuenlabrada. Originally created in 1995, it was re-opened in 2013 by achieving a vacant berth in LEB Plata.

In its first season after the re-opening, Fundación Baloncesto Fuenlabrada finished as champion of the 2013–14 LEB Plata and runner-up of the Copa LEB Plata. Despite promoting to LEB Oro, the club decided to continue playing in the same league of the previous season, but in Getafe as a result of a collaboration agreement with the town and CB Getafe, the main club in that city.

Naming
Maná Fuenlabrada 1996–2001
Reybol Fuenlabrada 2001–2002
Maná Fuenlabrada 2002–2003
Fuenlabrada-Getafe 2009–2011
Fuenlabrada-Illescas 2011–2012
Fundación Baloncesto Fuenlabrada 2013–2014
Viten Getafe (see CB Getafe) 2014–2016
Fundación Baloncesto Fuenlabrada 2016–

Season by season

Trophies
LEB Plata: (1)
2014

References

External links
Baloncesto Fuenlabrada Official Website

 
Liga ACB teams
Basketball teams in the Community of Madrid
Basketball teams established in 1983
Former Liga EBA teams